The Eure is a river between Normandy and Centre-Val de Loire in north-western France, left tributary of the Seine. It rises at Marchainville in the Orne department and joins the Seine near Pont-de-l'Arche. Two departments are named after the Eure, namely Eure and Eure-et-Loir.

Places along the river:
 Orne (61): Marchainville, La Lande-sur-Eure, Neuilly-sur-Eure.
 Eure-et-Loir (28): Courville-sur-Eure, Saint-Georges-sur-Eure, Fontenay-sur-Eure, Chartres, Saint-Prest, Maintenon, Nogent-le-Roi, Mézières-en-Drouais, Cherisy, Anet.
 Eure (27): Évreux, Ivry-la-Bataille, Garennes-sur-Eure, Bueil, Merey, Pacy-sur-Eure, Ménilles, Chambray, Croisy-sur-Eure, Autheuil-Authouillet, Acquigny, Louviers, Le Vaudreuil, Val de Reuil, Pont-de-l'Arche, Martot.

Its main tributaries are the Avre, the Iton and the Blaise from the left and the Voise, the Drouette and the Vesgre from the right.

References

Rivers of Orne
Rivers of Eure-et-Loir
Rivers of Eure
Rivers of Normandy
Rivers of Centre-Val de Loire
Rivers of France
Chartres